This is a list of people who have served as Lord-Lieutenant of Wexford. 

There were lieutenants of counties in Ireland until the reign of James II, when they were renamed governors. The office of Lord Lieutenant was recreated on 23 August 1831.

 The Hon. Edward FitzGerald Villiers: 1691–ca.1693 † ca.1693 Villiers family
 Arthur Gore, 2nd Earl of Arran:   1760–1768
 Arthur Annesley, 1st Earl of Mountnorris:  1768–1816 (died 1816)
 George Ogle: 1784 –1814 (died 1814)
 Charles Loftus, 1st Marquess of Ely: –1806 (died 1806)
 John Loftus, 2nd Marquess of Ely: 1805–1831
 George Annesley, 2nd Earl of Mountnorris: –1831 
 Charles Tottenham: 1815–1831
 James Stopford, 3rd Earl of Courtown: 1813–1831

Lord Lieutenants
 Robert Carew, 1st Baron Carew, 7 October 1831 – 2 June 1856
 Robert Carew, 2nd Baron Carew, 5 July 1856 – 8 September 1881
 Lord Maurice FitzGerald, 2 November 1881 – 14 April 1901
 James Stopford, 6th Earl of Courtown, 27 July 1901 – 1922

References

Wexford
 
History of County Wexford
Politics of County Wexford